David John Briggs (born 26 January 1951, Melbourne, Australia) is an Australian musician, songwriter and record producer, best known as lead guitarist in the rock band Little River Band between 1976 and 1981, having joined the band when original lead guitarist Ric Formosa left.

Professional career
In 1976 he joined Little River Band. He wrote their hit single "Lonesome Loser" and co-wrote "Happy Anniversary". 

Briggs also produced the rock band, Australian Crawl, and co-wrote their single "Hoochie Gucci Fiorucci Mama" with vocalist James Reyne. He produced Russell Morris' Almost Frantic album and started Rough Diamond Records with Ross Gardiner, a Melbourne-based music writer, which was distributed through Astor Records and then PolyGram. He signed the band No Fixed Address which was one of the first contemporary Aboriginal bands to record in Australia. Subsequently, the single "We Have Survived" was released, which was launched by Bob Hawke, the Prime Minister of Australia at the time. Briggs has also produced songs for artists, released on Rough Diamond.

Briggs works as a recording engineer and producer in Melbourne. Has worked on numerous records since starting the Production Workshop Recording Studio in 1979. Since 2002 he has been a lecturer at Victoria University, Melbourne, teaching Applied Acoustic Design and Advanced Digital Audio.

References

External links
 

1951 births
Living people
Australian guitarists
Australian songwriters
Australian record producers
Little River Band members
Musicians from Melbourne
People educated at Wesley College (Victoria)
Academic staff of the Victoria University, Melbourne